Kurort Baunt is a rural locality (a settlement) in Bauntovsky District, Republic of Buryatia, Russia. The population was 39 as of 2010. There are 7 streets.

Geography 
Kurort Baunt is located 113 km north of Bagdarin (the district's administrative centre) by road, on the right bank of the Upper Tsipa river. Lake Baunt and Kurort Baunt are located below the northeastern slopes of Bolshoy Khapton mountain.

References 

Rural localities in Bauntovsky District